The Amorous Flea is a musical with a book by Jerry Devine and music and lyrics by Bruce Montgomery.  It is based on Molière's 1662 comedy The School for Wives.

The off-Broadway production, directed by Jack Sydow, opened on February 17, 1964 at the East 78th Street Playhouse and moved to York Theatre, running for a total of 93 performances.  Proctor won the Theatre World Award for his performance.  Songs in the production include  "Lessons On Life".

Principal cast
Arnolphe - Lew Parker - Baritone
Chrysalde - David C. Jones - Baritone
Alain - Jack Fletcher - Baritone
Georgette - Ann Mitchell - Alto
Agnes - Imelda De Martin - Mezzo-soprano
Horace - Philip Proctor - Tenor

Synopsis
Arnolphe is about to marry Agnes, a beautiful orphaned girl whom he has groomed to be the perfect wife by sequestering her in a convent and keeping her totally ignorant of the outside world since she was four years old. Just as she reaches legal age, she meets and falls in love with Horace (son of Arnolphe's old friend Oronte), whom Arnolphe befriends without revealing his identity as the girl's lecherous fiancé. To his dismay, Horace persists in describing his success at wooing Agnes. Eventually her birth father Enrique arrives on the scene to demand she fulfill the marriage contract he arranged for her many years before, Agnes discovers the deception, and the revelation of the identity of the intended groom leaves Arnolphe a very unhappy man.

Songs

Act I
 All About Me
 All About He
 All About Him
 Learning Love
 There Goes a Mad Old Man
 Dialogue on Dalliance

Act II
 March of the Vigilant Vassals
 Lessons on Life
 Man is Man's Best Friend
 The Other Side of the Wall
 Closeness Begets Closeness

Act III
 It's a Stretchy Day
 When Time Takes Your Hand
 The Amorous Flea
 Learning Love (Reprise)
 Finale

References

Flinn, Denny Martin. Little Musicals for Little Theatres Hal Leonard (2006), pages 4–5
Synopsis and notes on the musical
Information about the show from the licensor

1964 musicals
Off-Broadway musicals
Adaptations of works by Molière